Danny Chan Pak-Keung (7 September 1958 – 25 October 1993) was a Hong Kong singer, songwriter, records producer and actor. He is widely recognised as the first modern day pop idol in Hong Kong, gaining fame alongside performers Alan Tam, Anita Mui, and Leslie Cheung, who were collectively known as "Three Kings and a Queen" (三王一后) or "Tam Cheung Mui Chan" (譚張梅陳) in the 1980s. He actively engaged in various charity shows and activities. His innate fashion sense was renowned in Hong Kong show business. Chan is best remembered for his Cantopop romance ballads and soul touching music compositions. His most renowned works include "Waiting" (等), "Life Expectation" (一生何求), "Ripples" (漣漪), "Loving You Alone" (偏偏喜歡你) and "Cherish Tonight" (今宵多珍重). Chan passed away on October 25, 1993, after being in a coma for 17 months.

Career
Chan was born on 7 September 1958 at Queen Mary Hospital in Pok Fu Lam (薄扶林). His father is Chan Pang-Fee (1923 – 5 April 2019), a businessman in the watch industry, who was fond of Cantonese opera and became one of his son's musical influences.

During childhood period Chan has developed a passion for music and has mostly learnt to play organ keyboard and piano by himself. He was an alumnus of St. Paul's Co-educational College and also a fellow classmate of lyricist Andrew Lam Man Chung (林敏驄). 

Chan won third prize at the TVB "Hong Kong Pop Song Writing Invitation" in 1977 with his self-written english song "The Rocky Road". In 1978, he won first prize at the "Hong Kong Yamaha Electone Festival" by playing the theme music of the movie "Close Encounters of the Third Kind". This has earned him a singer contract with Hong Kong Television Broadcasts (TVB) and has officially launched his entertainment career. In that same year, he made his acting debut with HK TVB through a TV drama called "Sweet Babe" (甜姐兒).

Chan's musical talent has attracted the attention of artist manager Tam Kwok-Gei (譚國基). Tam signed Chan under his artist management agency Hollywood Casting Agency (HCA) and subsequently made Chan to sign a records contract with EMI. Chan's first music album "First Love" was released in 1979. His self-composed song from the album, "Tears for You" (眼淚為你流), was an instant hit. 
 
Chan subsequently signed music contracts with Hong Kong EMI (1979), WEA (1980), DMI (1986), and finally moved back to WEA (1989). His Cantopop romance ballads have achieved high level of public success and critical acclaim, some of which are still popular nowaday such as "Waiting" (等), "Life Expectation" (一生何求), "Ripples" (漣漪), "Loving You Alone" (偏偏喜歡你), "Cherish Tonight" (今宵多珍重), "Deeply in Love with You" (深愛著你), "Having You" (有了你), "Misty Rain" (煙雨悽迷), "Applause" (喝采), "Minutes’ Date" (幾分鐘的約會), etc. The song, "Remembrance on Parents' Love" (念親恩), is often played on radio stations and frequently chosen for karaoke.

Chan's first five albums were produced by Tam Kwok-Gei, and the song concepts were mostly targeted towards youth. Chan composed a large quantity of songs during this period. From the sixth album, "Pouring Out My Heart"(傾訴), onward, Chan started to produce his albums himself. He reached his first peak in his musical career with this album and the next one, "Loving You Alone"(偏偏喜歡你), where the album sales achieved 5-platinum certifications (250,000 copies) in Hong Kong.

In 1984, he sang an English duet "Tell Me What Can I Do" with American country music singer Crystal Gayle. It was produced in US and released in US/Japan but was largely unknown due to lack of promotional budget. Meanwhile, he has also covered Jim Capaldi's ballad "Warm" with an improved music arrangement.

In the early 1980s, Chan was a host in the TV show "Bang Bang Sound" (Bang Bang咁嘅聲). His co-operation with Leslie Cheung and Paul Chung in the films "Encore" (1980) (喝采) and "On Trial" (1981) (失業生), received positive reception from the public and media. He is the main character in HK TVB TV series "Breakthrough" (1982) (突破) together with his favourite female partner Mary Jean Reimer (翁靜晶). His only comedy film "Merry Christmas" (1984) (聖誕快樂) was a huge box office success. He is also one of the main character in the most famous romantic film in the 1980s, "An Autumn's Tale" (1987) (秋天的童話), as Vincent (Jennifer's ex-boyfriend), with Chow Yun-fat (as Samuel Pang) and Cherie Chung (as Jennifer).
 
During the span of his music career, Chan held many music concerts in Hong Kong, China, Japan, Singapore, Malaysia, Australia, Thailand, Canada and the United States. He held his first major local concerts at the Queen Elizabeth Stadium in July 1982 (2 nights), and another concerts in the newly developed Hong Kong Stadium in September 1983 (2 nights), both were organised by Brainchild Productions (富才制作). From this time onward, all of his major concerts were held in Hong Kong Stadium. His avant-garde concept January 1985 concerts (3 nights) was organised by Capitol Artists Entertainment (華星娛樂), but was met with underwhelming feedback. Warm critical acclaims was received in the Dickson Entertainment (迪生娛樂) organised concerts in December 1986 (2 nights) and April 1988 (4 nights). His 10th anniversary concerts in September/October 1989 (6 nights), and the purple theme concerts in March 1991 (3 nights) were organised by Yiu Wing Entertainment (耀榮娛樂).

Chan also participated and represented Hong Kong in various music festivals such as the World Popular Song Festival 1984 in Tokyo, the Nagasaki Asia Music Festival 1988 in Japan, Peace Music Concert 1988 in Singapore, Tokyo Music Festival 1989 and the Shanghai Music Festival 1991 in China. He was also invited to perform at the Seoul Korea Summer Olympic Games 1988 opening ceremony. In 1986, he performed in the presence of The Royal Thai princess in a Thai charity show.

In 1991, Chan announced of his decision to leave the Hong Kong music industry. He held his first farewell concert in Shanghai in January and February 1992. He has planned to hold a few more farewell concerts in the US, Canada and Hong Kong but his sudden fall into coma in May 1992 halted the plan.

Death and speculation
Chan suffered from mild depression, which worsened during the late 1980s. 

On 18 May 1992, Chan was found unconscious and he was admitted to Queen Mary Hospital in Hong Kong. It was speculated that this was due to an accidental mixing of alcohol with medicine. Chan had suffered from advanced brain damage. He went into a coma for 17 months and died on 25 October 1993 at the age of 35.

Commemoration

On 22 October 1995, Chan's father, Chan Pang-Fee, has sponsored and built a Danny Commemoration Pavilion (陳百強紀念館) in his ancestors' hometown Sijiu Town, Taishan City, Guangdong Province, China (中國廣東省台山市四九鎮). It is a favourite place for Danny's fans to visit until these days.

On 8 November 2005, the Hong Kong Post issued a set of special stamps featuring "Hong Kong Pop Singers". This stamp set focused on Hong Kong's popular singers, saluting five pop stars who have left their marks on Cantopop music history. Chan was featured on the HK$1.80 stamp.

Discography

1978, The Sunrise (english), unreleased
1980, Tears in Tears (淚中淚), a song by Wong Hoi Yan (黃愷欣)
1981, Cherish Me (為我珍重), a song by Blanche Tang Oi Lam (鄧藹霖)
1984, Love Prediction (戀愛預告),	a song by Sandy Lamb (林姍姍)
1987, Love Without Reasons (愛不問為何), a song by Roman Tam (罗文)
1988, 12 Hours (十二小時), a song by Samantha Lam (林志美)

Filmography

Cinematic Films
1980, Encore (喝采)
1981, On Trial / Job Hunter (失業生)
1984, Merry Christmas (聖誕快樂)
1986, My Family (八喜臨門)
1987, An Autumn's Tale (秋天的童話) a.k.a. Chau tin tik tung wa (Hong Kong Cantonese title); a.k.a. Liumang daheng (流氓大亨) (Taiwan Mandarin title)

TV Dramas
1977, Sweet Babe (甜姐兒) (produced by HK TVB)
1980, Take Turn (輪流轉) (produced by HK TVB)
1980, Breakthrough (突破) (produced by HK TVB)

Concerts

Awards

▲ In 1999, the song "Ripples" (漣漪) was used by the Hong Kong Government in a commercial clip for Tracker Fund of Hong Kong IPO.

1981, "Model Youth" in Wong Tai Sin District, Hong Kong
1987, "Hong Kong Top 10 Best Dressed Personnel" by Hong Kong Fashion Designers Association
1989, "Hong Kong Top 10 Good-Looking Personnel" by Commercial Radio Hong Kong
1990, "Hong Kong Top 10 Best Dressed Personnel" by Hong Kong Fashion Designers Association

References

External links
The website dannyfans.com (离不开，陈百强) was created in January 2000, and welcome for all his loyal fans. The domain name lost in 2008. The actual working site (2015-current) is http://dannychan.cn/danny-library/ 
The website (离不开，陈百强) domain was switched to dannychan.org temporarily, then switched to dannychan.cn in 2015. "离不开，陈百强" bbs data（2001-2017）was moved to http://dannychan.cn/dannybbs/
dannychan.cn is the current "离不开，陈百强" website. "陈百强资料馆"(http://www.dannychan.cn/danny-library/) was built in 2015 for the upgrade of the old site "离不开".
One of the Facebook discussion groups is "離不開 陳百強 Danny Chan Nest"
Danny Chan in Memoriam 
Speech by Postmaster General at issue of "Hong Kong Pop Singers" special stamps
Danny Chan Group in Youtube – with over 390 videos of Danny

1958 births
1993 deaths
Alumni of St. Paul's Co-educational College
20th-century Hong Kong male singers
Cantopop singer-songwriters
Hong Kong Buddhists
Hong Kong singer-songwriters
Ballad musicians
Hong Kong male television actors
Hong Kong male film actors
Hong Kong idols